The War Boy is a 1985 Canadian-Yugoslav war drama film and the second feature film to be directed by Allan Eastman about a boy growing up in war torn Eastern Europe.

Synopsis
In 1940, after the outbreak of the Second World War, life is hard in a small East European border town under Nazi occupation, as witnessed primarily by a Canadian-born twelve-year-old boy, Jan (Jason Hopley). At times life appears to go on as normal: Jan plays with his dog and has a good relationship with his father Stephan (Kenneth Welsh). But after all a war is on, and with an occupation come midnight raids and violence in the form of street shootings and exploding mortar shells.

Jan's father helps a Jewish family stay in hiding, but also houses an SS officer (Slobodan Dimitrijević) passing through the town. Jan, who has already lost his mother, fears his father may ultimately not survive the war. His stepmother Maria (Helen Shaver) treats him with disdain, and flirts with the German officer. Like his father, Jan defies the Nazis by helping the Jews escape, but is also affected by the sight of wounded German soldiers passing by his home.

Jan's character is tempered by these events like "the making of a fine sword"; the boy will become a man ready to "forge his future in a country without fear and hate."

Cast

In addition, various soldiers were played by Ilija Ivezić and Damir Mejovšek.

Voice performers: Mary Beth Rubens, Peter Jobin, Michael Kirby, Jeff Pustil, and Robyn Jaffe.

Themes
The War Boy has been compared to the "similarly themed" Empire of the Sun, a 1987 film by Steven Spielberg which also depicts "a child's eye view of the horrors of war."

Production

Background and financing
After making his first feature, A Sweeter Song (1976), Allan Eastman directed around a hundred television productions before undertaking a second feature, which was made with the support of Telefilm Canada.

Filming
The film's working title was Point of Escape. Unlike A Sweeter Song, which was shot on 16mm film, The War Boy was shot on 35mm (Kodak 5247 and 5294). Principal photography took place in Zagreb, Croatia (then part of Yugoslavia) from 24 September to 28 October 1984.

Release and reception
The War Boy was released in 1985 and distributed by  Norstar Releasing, Peter Simpson's recently created (1984) Canadian indepdendent distribution company.

Home media
The War Boy was released on VHS, Betamax, and DVD.

In 2007, The War Boy was released as part of a war film anthology DVD box set of five discs by Eclectic called the Dogs o' War Collection, featuring ten films predominantly by Italian directors, prompting Chadwick Jenkins to call them "Spaghetti War Flicks" after Spaghetti Westerns.

Critical response
Jenkins praises The War Boy, saying it "beautifully captures the contradictions of wartime and the devastating nature of simply living and growing up in such times." His only criticism of the film is that the "News on the March" opening sequence is undermined "by having the credits roll over the newsreel." The film is "unjustly underrated", and when compared with Spielberg's big-budget Empire of the Sun (1987), is arguably "more successful on an intimate, personal level in depicting a child's eye view of the horrors of war." Terry Rowan calls Jason Hopely's novice performance "beautiful", as does VideoHound's Golden Movie Retriever, which assigns the film 2.5 stars.

The Great Canadian Movie Guide, by sharp contrast, derides The War Boy as "choppy and confusingly disjointed", "with somewhat stilted performances and dialogue" and fails to develop most characters and scenes, or even the idea that the children were born in Canada.

References

External links
The War Boy on IMDb

1980s war drama films
English-language Canadian films
English-language Yugoslav films
Canadian war drama films
Yugoslav war drama films
Films directed by Allan Eastman
1985 drama films
1985 films
Yugoslav World War II films
1980s English-language films
Canadian World War II films
1980s Canadian films